The Adlerhorn is a mountain of the Swiss Pennine Alps, located east of Zermatt in the canton of Valais. It lies west of the Strahlhorn.

References

External links

 Adlerhorn on Hikr
 The Adlerhorn on Mount Wiki

Pennine Alps
Alpine three-thousanders
Mountains of Valais
Mountains of the Alps
Mountains of Switzerland
Three-thousanders of Switzerland